The Strasser is a breed of fancy pigeon developed over many years of selective breeding. Strassers, along with other varieties of domesticated pigeons, are all descendants from the rock pigeon (Columba livia).
Apart from exhibition at pigeon shows, the breed is also used for utility purposes for producing squabs as food.

See also 

List of pigeon breeds

References

Pigeon breeds

External links 
 Strasser Pigeon: Breed Guide - Pigeonpedia